A list of films produced in Egypt in 1987. For an A-Z list of films currently on Wikipedia, see :Category:Egyptian films.

External links
 Egyptian films of 1987 at the Internet Movie Database
 Egyptian films of 1987 elCinema.com

Lists of Egyptian films by year
1987 in Egypt
Lists of 1987 films by country or language